Comberanche-et-Épeluche is a commune in the Dordogne department in Nouvelle-Aquitaine in southwestern France.

Surrounded by the towns of Bourg-du-Bost, Germans, and Petit-Bersac, Comberanche-and-Épeluche is located 37 km northwest of Perigueux.

In 1820, the communes of Comberanche and Épeluche merged into Comberanche-et-Épeluche.

Population

See also
Communes of the Dordogne department

References

Communes of Dordogne